Marko Tomićević (born 19 April 1990) is a Serbian sprint canoer.

He won a silver medal in the K-2 1000 m event at the 2016 Summer Olympics in Rio de Janeiro.

External links

Biography
Silver medal

1990 births
Living people
People from Bečej
Serbian male canoeists
Olympic canoeists of Serbia
Canoeists at the 2012 Summer Olympics
Canoeists at the 2016 Summer Olympics
Canoeists at the 2015 European Games
European Games competitors for Serbia
Olympic silver medalists for Serbia
Olympic medalists in canoeing
Medalists at the 2016 Summer Olympics
Mediterranean Games silver medalists for Serbia
Competitors at the 2009 Mediterranean Games
ICF Canoe Sprint World Championships medalists in kayak
Mediterranean Games medalists in canoeing
European champions for Serbia